The University City Science Center (UCSC) was established as the first and largest urban research park in the United States. It was established in 1963, within the demolished Black Bottom neighborhood of Philadelphia, now known as University City. Today it offers startup support services, allocates capital, gathers the innovation community, and builds inclusive STEM  pathways for Philadelphia youth and adults. 

An independent 2016 study reported that graduate organizations and current residents that have benefited from University City Science Center’s business incubation services have created more than 12,000 jobs that remain in the Greater Philadelphia region today and contribute more than $13 billion to the regional economy annually.

Location 

The Science Center, in partnership with Wexford Science + Technology and Ventas, Inc operates a 27-acre campus called uCity Square, made up of 17 buildings along Market Street in University City, West Philadelphia. In 2015, the campus was re-branded to uCity Square. The campus is located near Drexel University, the University of Pennsylvania, University of the Sciences, Children's Hospital of Philadelphia, and the Wistar Institute. All but one building have been constructed in accordance with the Philadelphia Redevelopment Authority.

History 
The Science Center has engaged in formal business incubation since it opened its first shared facility in 2000, followed by the Hubert J.P. Schoemaker Center for Technology Advancement in 2006 and 3711 in 2009. in 2016 the Science Center announced a strategic partnership with Cambridge Innovation Center (CIC) who took over management of shared office and lab space at uCity Square.

Launched in 2011, Quorum is a convening space for entrepreneurs and innovators throughout the region to convene, interact, network and exchange ideas.  The modular space facilitates their ability to build knowledge and explore opportunities. In September 2018, Quorum moved from 3711 Market Street to 3675 Market Street where it tripled in size, totaling 11,000 square feet of meeting and event space.

According to University City Science Center: An Engine of Economic Growth for Greater Philadelphia, which was prepared by the Economy League of Greater Philadelphia, graduate firms that remain in the Philadelphia area produce $4.2 million in state income taxes and $22 million in Philadelphia city wage taxes every year.

On May 28, 2010, the Science Center filed a lawsuit to stop the Philadelphia Development Authority from seizing two parcels of land in the 3800 block of Market Street when the Authority contended that the Science Center was in default of its development agreement in September, 2009. The Science Center argued in its lawsuit that current economic conditions had delayed redevelopment, constituting an unforeseeable cause of the apparent default, and therefore should not be grounds for taking back the land. The dispute was ended in April 2012, when the two organizations amended the redevelopment agreement to allow more time for the Science Center to complete the development of its campus.

In August 2012, the Science Center announced it was to begin development of its next parcel, a 272,700-square-foot building at the northeast corner of 38th and Market streets, to house outpatient medical facilities, ground-floor retail, and office and lab space for startup and growing companies.

Ownership
The center is a nonprofit 501(c)(3) organization with 31 regional shareholders:

References

External links 
 University City Science Center home page
 "Come to Where the Knowledge Is": A History of the University City Science Center

Science parks in the United States
Business incubators of the United States
University City, Philadelphia
Buildings and structures in Philadelphia